Ten ships of the Royal Navy have been named HMS Lightning.

The first  was an 8-gun fire ship launched in 1691 and captured by the French in 1705.
The second  was an 8-gun bomb vessel launched in 1740 and captured off Livorno during the War of the Austrian Succession in 1746.
The 14-gun sloop , launched in 1746, was converted to a fire ship and renamed Lightning in 1755. She was sold in 1762
The 14-gun sloop , purchased in 1776, was converted to a fire ship and renamed Lightning in 1779. She was sold in 1783.
The fifth  was a  launched in 1806, converted to a sloop in 1808, and sold in 1816.
The sixth , launched in 1823, was a paddle steamer, one of the first steam-powered ships on the Navy List. She served initially as a packet ship, but was later converted into an oceanographic survey vessel. 
The seventh  was an 18-gun sloop launched in 1829, renamed Larne in 1832, and broken up in 1866.
The eighth , was a torpedo boat, built by John Thornycroft. She was the first seagoing vessel to be armed with self-propelled torpedoes. She was later known as TB-1.
She served in World War I until she struck a mine in 1915 that sank her.
The tenth , launched in 1940, was an L-class destroyer that served in World War II. The German motor torpedo boat S-55 torpedoed and sank her on 12 March 1943 in the Strait of Sicily.

See also

References

Royal Navy ship names